New Hope is an unincorporated community in Franklin County, Texas, United States.

History
New Hope had a church, a store, and several scattered houses in the 1930s. The only population recorded for the community was 20 in 1940. The community had a church and several scattered houses in 1988.

Geography

Education
In 1896, New Hope had a school with one teacher and 77 White students. There were two schools in the community in the 1930s. Today, the community is served by the Mount Vernon Independent School District.

References

Unincorporated communities in Franklin County, Texas
Unincorporated communities in Texas